The Bryan–Chamorro Treaty was signed between Nicaragua and the United States on August 5, 1914. It gave the United States full rights over any future canal built through Nicaragua. The Wilson administration changed the treaty by adding a provision similar in language to that of the Platt Amendment, which would have authorized military intervention in Nicaragua. The United States Senate opposed the new provision; in response, it was dropped and the treaty was formally ratified on June 19, 1916.

History
The democratically elected and reform-minded Liberal Party president José Santos Zelaya López had incurred the wrath of the United States by negotiating with France, Germany, and Japan to resurrect the proposed Nicaragua Canal, which might constitute potential future foreign competition with the newly-built US-owned Panama Canal. After supporting an insurgency against the government led by Conservative Party insurgents Emiliano Chamorro and Juan José Estrada with arms, funds, troops, warships, and economic measures, the United States eventually forced the popular liberal Presidents José Zelaya and then Jose Madriz to flee the country. It then installed the conservative governments of first Juan José Estrada (soon deposed by the powerful Secretary of War Luis Mena) and then former Vice President Adolfo Diaz. When General Luis Mena convinced the National Assembly to name him successor to the unpopular pro-U.S. Adolfo Diaz, the United States invaded and occupied Nicaragua militarily from 1912 to 1933, wrote a new constitution for the country, changed the National Assembly, and propped up successive conservative regimes under the presidents Adolfo Diaz, Emiliano Chamorro, and Diego Manuel Chamorro. Luis Mena fled into the countryside to start a rebellion, which continued under various leaders for the next 60 years. In exchange for political concessions from Adolfo Diaz, the United States provided the military strength to suppress popular revolt and ensure the conservative regime maintained control over the Nicaraguan government. For much of the 20th century, Nicaragua remained controlled under the hereditary dictatorship of the Chamorro and after 1936 the Somoza dynasties until widespread rebellions forced them out of power in the 1970s.

The Treaty was named after the principal negotiators: William Jennings Bryan, U.S. Secretary of State; and the then General Emiliano Chamorro, representing the Nicaraguan government. By the terms of the treaty, the United States acquired the rights to any canal built in Nicaragua in perpetuity, a renewable 99 year option to establish a naval base in the Gulf of Fonseca, and a renewable 99-year lease to the Great and Little Corn Islands in the Caribbean. For those concessions, Nicaragua received three million dollars.

Most of the three million dollars was paid back to U.S. creditors by U.S. officials in charge of Nicaraguan financial affairs, which allowed the Nicaraguan government to continue to collect internal revenue. The debt had been quickly amassed in a two-year period by the Nicaraguan government of Juan José Estrada under the American "dollars for bullets" scheme to retard infrastructure development funding from rival powers and lingering debts from earlier indemnities Nicaragua was forced to pay the foreign occupying powers of the United States and Great Britain, and repairing the devastation inflicted from the war with Great Britain, war with the United States and the civil war of Luis Mena's Rebellion.

At the request of Nicaragua, the United States under Richard Nixon and Nicaragua under Anastasio Somoza Debayle held a convention, on July 14, 1970, that officially abolished the treaty and all its provisions.

Intended impact
At various times since the Panama Canal opened in 1914, the Nicaragua route has been reconsidered. The Bryan–Chamorro Treaty kept Nicaragua from—and stopped any potential European powers from—competing with the Panama Canal.

Unintended impact
The provision of the Bryan–Chamorro Treaty granting rights to United States to build a naval base in the Gulf of Fonseca was contested by El Salvador and Costa Rica.  The Central American Court of Justice saw in the favor of the two countries.  The United States ignored the decision, contributing significantly to the court's collapse in 1918.

See also
 Nicaragua–United States relations
 Banana Wars

Notes

Further reading
 Baker, George W. "The Wilson Administration and Nicaragua, 1913–1921." The Americas 22.4 (1966): 339-376 https://doi.org/10.2307/979017  online
 Bemis, Samuel Flagg. The Latin American Policy of the United States. (1943) passim and p. 465  online

 Bermann, Karl. Under the big stick: Nicaragua and the United States since 1848 (Boston: South End Press, 1986)
 Coletta, Paolo E. William Jennings Bryan: Progressive politician and moral statesman, 1909-1915. Vol. 2 (U of Nebraska Press, 1964).
 Harrison, Benjamin T. "Woodrow Wilson and Nicaragua." Caribbean Quarterly 51.1 (2005): 25-36. online
 Link, Arthur S. Wilson: The New Freedom (1956) pp. 331–342.
 Link, Arthur S. ed. The Papers of Woodrow Wilson volume 27: 1913 (1978) pp 526–530 for summary of treaty.
 Munro, Dana G. "Dollar Diplomacy in Nicaragua, 1909-1913." Hispanic American Historical Review 38.2 (1958): 209-234. online
 Jones, Howard (2001). Crucible of Power: A History of U.S. Foreign Relations Since 1897. Scholarly Resources Inc 
 Walker, Thomas W. (2003). Nicaragua: Living in the Shadow of the Eagle (4th ed.). Westview Press. .

External links
 Text of Bryan-Chamorro Treaty - Library of Congress

1914 in Nicaragua
1916 in Nicaragua
Banana Wars
Treaties concluded in 1914
Treaties entered into force in 1916
Treaties of the United States
Treaties of Nicaragua
Nicaragua–United States relations
William Jennings Bryan